Tansen Pande (1910–1966) was a prominent Dhrupad singer.

He was born Husseinuddin Dagar, the youngest son of Allabande Khan. His other three brothers, Nasiruddin, Rahimuddin and Imanuddin Khan Dagar, were also famous singers of Dhrupad style. He decided to return to the family's original religion, became a Hindu, and took the name Tansen Pande.

His son Saeeduddin Dagar was a Dhrupad performer who resided in Pune in western India.

References

External links 
 http://dhrupad.info/hussainuddin.htm

Hindustani singers
1966 deaths
1910 births
20th-century Indian singers
Singers from Pune